In 1932–1933, a man-made famine known as the Holodomor killed 3.3–5 million people in the Ukrainian Soviet Socialist Republic, included in a total of 5.5–8.7 million killed by the broader Soviet famine of 1932–1933. At least 3.3 million ethnic Ukrainians died as a result of the famine in the Soviet Union. Scholars debate whether the famine was a "central act in a campaign of genocide", or whether it was intended to drive Ukrainian peasants into "collectives and ensure a steady supply of grain for Soviet industrialization."

According to historian Simon Payaslian, the scholarly consensus classifies the Holodomor as a genocide. The topic remains a significant issue in modern politics and some historians dispute whether Soviet policies would fall under the legal definition of genocide. Scholars who reject the argument that state policy in regard to the famine was genocide do not absolve Joseph Stalin or any other parts of the Soviet regime as a whole from guilt for the famine deaths, and may still view such policies as being ultimately criminal in nature.

Since 2006, political campaigns have sought recognition of the Holodomor as a genocide, and, as of 2023, 26 countries and the European Union have recognised the Holodomor as a genocide.

Publications before the dissolution of the USSR

Rafael Lemkin 
Rafael Lemkin, who coined the term "genocide" and initiated the Genocide Convention, wrote that the Holodomor "is a classic example of the Soviet genocide, the longest and most extensive experiment in Russification, namely the extermination of the Ukrainian nation". Lemkin stated that it consisted of four steps: 
 Extermination of the Ukrainian national elite, "the brain of the nation", which took place in 1920, 1926 and 1930–1933
 Liquidation of the Ukrainian Autocephalous Orthodox Church, "the soul of the nation", which occurred between 1926 and 1932 and during which 10,000 of its priests were killed
 Extermination of a significant part of the Ukrainian peasantry as "custodians of traditions, folklore and music, national language and literature, and the national spirit" (the Holodomor itself)
 Populating the territory with other nationalities with intent of mixing Ukrainians with them, which would eventually lead to the dissolution of the Ukrainian nation.

James Mace 
Professor of political science James Mace helped British historian Robert Conquest complete the book The Harvest of Sorrow, and after that he was the only U.S. historian working on the Ukrainian famine, and the first to categorically name it as a genocide, while Soviet archives remained closed and without direct evidence of the authorities' intent. In his 1986 article "The man-made famine of 1933 in Soviet Ukraine" written before the archives were opened in 1987, Mace wrote:For the Ukrainians the famine must be understood as the most terrible part of a consistent policy carried out against them: the destruction of their cultural and spiritual elite which began with the trial of the Union for the Liberation of Ukraine, the destruction of the official Ukrainian wing of the Communist Party, and the destruction of their social basis in the countryside. Against them the famine seems to have been designed as part of a campaign to destroy them as a political factor and as a social organism.

Mace, staff director for the U.S. Commission on the Ukraine Famine, compiled a 1988 Report to Congress, he stated that, based on anecdotal evidence, the Soviets had purposely prevented Ukrainians from leaving famine-struck regions; this was later confirmed by the discovery of Stalin's January 1933 secret decree "Preventing the Mass Exodus of Peasants who are Starving", restricting travel by peasants after "in the Kuban and Ukraine a massive outflow of peasants 'for bread' has begun", that "like the outflow from Ukraine last year, was organized by the enemies of Soviet power." Roman Serbyn called this document one of the "smoking gun revelations about the genocide." One of the nineteen main conclusions of the Report to Congress was that "Joseph Stalin and those around him committed genocide against Ukrainians in 1932–1933."

Robert Conquest 
In 1986, British historian Robert Conquest published The Harvest of Sorrow: Soviet Collectivisation and the Terror-Famine, dealing with the collectivization of agriculture in Ukraine and elsewhere in the Soviet Union under Stalin's direction in 1929–1931 and the resulting famine, in which millions of peasants died due to starvation, deportation to labor camps, and execution. In this book, Conquest supported the view that the famine was a planned act of genocide. According to historians Stephen Wheatcroft and R. W. Davies, "Conquest holds that Stalin wanted the famine... and that the Ukrainian famine was deliberately inflicted for its own sake." 

Conquest's scholarly rival Wheatcroft claimed that in unpublished 2003 correspondence Conquest recanted his view that "Stalin purposely inflicted the 1933 famine. No. What I argue is that with resulting famine imminent, he could have prevented it, but put 'Soviet interest' other than feeding the starving first thus consciously abetting it." Wheatcroft's assertion contradicts published statements Conquest made just four years prior directly disputing Wheatcroft's views, writing, "Wheatcroft takes it that Stalin did not 'consciously plan' the famine. 'Plan' is a slippery word: what we are saying is that he consciously inflicted it."

In an interview recorded in 2006 Conquest stated the Holodomor should be recognized as an attack on the Ukrainian people, and discussed some of the problems surrounding the label genocide. In 2007, Stanislav Kulchytsky opined that Conquest's position had softened under pressure from "revisionists", and weakened the argument for the Holodomor as genocide.

John Archibald Getty 
Historian John Archibald Getty, in a critique of The Harvest of Sorrow, which asserted Conquest's original claim that the famine constituted a genocide, states that the conclusion of the famine being engineered is a tempting one but that it is poorly supported by and requires a highly stretched interpretation of the evidence, but that Stalin nonetheless was the entity most responsible for the disaster, citing his role as the prime-backer of hardline collectivisation and excessive demands on the peasantry.

Firstly, Getty calls into question the estimate of the death toll at around five million Ukrainians presented in The Harvest of Sorrow as being much too high, citing much lower demographic estimates from Stephen Wheatcroft, Barbara Anderson, and Brian Silver, and notes that the severity of the famine varied greatly between local regions of Ukraine. Secondly, Getty says that the book fails to provide a convincing motive for genocide, and that other explanations for the famine better fit the evidence than the intentional genocide thesis. Getty points to the fact that Stalin's power was not absolute during these years of his rule, and that he had limited de facto control over local bureaucrats, with many of the Kremlin's orders regarding collectivisation during this time being subverted or ignored at lower levels of the chain of command; in some regions, local bureaucrats exceeded Stalin's demands for expropriation of kulaks, whereas in others, Stalin's demands for expropriation were disregarded and contravened. Moreover, even Stalin's own plans during this time period were frequently unclear and subject to constant change, furthering confusion among the lower bureaucracy and the peasantry; in some districts, farms were collectivised, then decollectivised, and then collectivised yet again within the span of less than a year. Getty also attributes the failure of Soviet authorities to relieve the famine once they realised it was going on to Stalin's paranoia and chaotic decision-making, and that as with his reaction to the German invasion of the Soviet Union in Operation Barbarossa, the delays by the central government to adequately respond to the crisis stemmed from Stalin's intense distrust even of his own advisors rather than a calculated, deliberate effort to prolong the starvation.

Publications after the dissolution of the USSR

Famine as a genocide

Norman Naimark 
Professor of East European studies Norman Naimark states that the Holodomor's deaths were intentional and thus were genocide. In his 2010 book Stalin's Genocides, Naimark wrote:

The Ukrainian killer famine should be considered an act of genocide. There is enough evidence—if not overwhelming evidence—to indicate that Stalin and his lieutenants knew that the widespread famine in the USSR in 1932–33 hit Ukraine particularly hard, and that they were ready to see millions of Ukrainian peasants die as a result. They made no efforts to provide relief; they prevented the peasants from seeking food themselves in the cities or elsewhere in the USSR; and they refused to relax restrictions on grain deliveries until it was too late. Stalin's hostility to the Ukrainians and their attempts to maintain their form of "home rule" as well as his anger that Ukrainian peasants resisted collectivization fueled the killer famine.

Timothy Snyder 
Professor of history Timothy Snyder stated that the starvation was "deliberate" and that several of the most lethal policies applied only, or mostly, to Ukraine. In his 2010 book Bloodlands, Snyder stated:

In the waning weeks of 1932, facing no external security threat and no challenge from within, with no conceivable justification except to prove the inevitability of his rule, Stalin chose to kill millions of people in Soviet Ukraine.... It was not food shortages but food distribution that killed millions in Soviet Ukraine, and it was Stalin who decided who was entitled to what.

In a 2017 Q&A, Snyder said that he believed the famine was genocide but refrained from using the term because it might confuse people, explaining:

If you asked me, is the Ukrainian Holodomor genocide? Yes, in my view, it is. In my view, it meets the criteria of the law of genocide of 1948, the Convention – it meets the ideas that Raphael Lemkin laid down. Is Armenia genocide? Yes, I believe legally it very easily meets that qualification. I just don't think that means what people think it means. Because there are people who hear the word "genocide" and they think it means the attempt to kill every man woman and child, and the Armenian genocide is closer to the Holocaust than most other cases, right, but it's not the same thing. So, I hesitate to use "genocide" because I think every time the word "genocide" is used it provokes misunderstanding.

Andrea Graziosi 
According to Italian historian and professor , the Holodomor constituted a genocide. And was, "the first genocide that was methodically planned out and perpetrated by depriving the very people who were producers of food of their nourishment"

Graziosi noted that even under the most restrictive definitions of genocide, "deliberately inflicting on members of the group conditions of life calculated to bring about its physical destruction in whole or in part" is listed as a genocidal act. He also cited the time Lemkin had commented that, “generally speaking, genocide does not necessarily mean the immediate destruction of a nation…It is intended rather to signify a coordinated plan of different actions aiming at the destruction of essential foundations of the life of national groups.”.

Graziosi also emphazized the root of the genocide was "unquestionably a subjective act" which was to use the famine in an "anti-Ukrainian sense on the basis of the 'national interpretation'". Without this, Graziosi said, the death toll would have been at most in the hundreds of thousands.

Nancy Qian  
According to a Centre for Economic Policy Research paper published in 2021 by Andrei Markevich, Natalya Naumenko, and Nancy Qian, regions with higher Ukrainian population shares were struck harder with centrally planned policies corresponding to famine such as increased procurement rate, and Ukrainian populated areas were given lower amounts of tractors which the paper argues demonstrates that ethnic discrimination across the board was centrally planned, ultimately concluding that 92% of famine deaths in Ukraine alone along with 77% of famine deaths in Ukraine, Russia, and Belarus combined can be explained by systematic bias against Ukrainians. Nancy Qian notes in a lecture about the paper that these results are entirely consistent "with a model of ethnic bias and mass killing" for the famine presented by other authors.

Famine as a crime but not genocide

Robert Davies and Stephen Wheatcroft 
Professors R. W. Davies and Stephen G. Wheatcroft state the famine was man-made but unintentional. They believe that a combination of rapid industrialization and two successive bad harvests (1931 and 1932) were the primary reason of the famine. Davies and Wheatcroft agree that Stalin's policies towards the peasants were brutal and ruthless and do not absolve Stalin from responsibility for the massive famine deaths; Wheatcroft says that the Soviet government's policies during the famine were criminal acts of fraud and manslaughter, though not outright murder or genocide. Wheatcroft comments that nomadic and peasant culture was destroyed by Soviet collectivization, which complies with Raphael Lemkin's older concept of genocide, which included cultural destruction as an aspect of the crime, such as that of North American Indians and Australian Aborigines. In addition while Wheatcroft rejects the genocide characterization of the famine, he states that "the grain collection campaign was associated with the reversal of the previous policy of Ukrainisation."

In his 2018 article "The Turn Away from Economic Explanations for Soviet Famines", Wheatcroft wrote:

We all agreed that Stalin's policy was brutal and ruthless and that its cover up was criminal, but we do not believe that it was done on purpose to kill people and cannot therefore be described as murder or genocide.... Davies and I have (2004) produced the most detailed account of the grain crisis in these years, showing the uncertainties in the data and the mistakes carried out by a generally ill-informed, and excessively ambitious, government. The state showed no signs of a conscious attempt to kill lots of Ukrainians and belated attempts that sought to provide relief when it eventually saw the tragedy unfolding were evident.... But in the following ten years there has been a revival of the 'man-made on purpose' side. This reflects both a reduced interest in understanding the economic history, and increased attempts by the Ukrainian government to classify the 'famine as a genocide'. It is time to return to paying more attention to economic explanations.

Michael Ellman critiqued Davies and Wheatcroft's view of intent as too narrow, stating:

According to them [Davies and Wheatcroft], only taking an action whose sole objective is to cause deaths among the peasantry counts as intent. Taking an action with some other goal (e.g. exporting grain to import machinery) but which the actor certainly knows will also cause peasants to starve does not count as intentionally starving the peasants. However, this is an interpretation of 'intent' which flies in the face of the general legal interpretation.

Robert Conquest 
Wheatcroft and Davies noted that Conquest (the author of The Harvest of Sorrow) would later go on to walk back much of the claims made in his earlier book. In a 2003 letter, Conquest clarified to them that "Stalin purposely inflicted the 1933 famine? No. What I argue is that with resulting famine imminent, he could have prevented it, but put "Soviet interest" other than feeding the starving first thus consciously abetting it." In a 2008 interview with Radio Free Europe/Radio Liberty, Conquest further stated of the famine that "I don't think the word genocide as such is a very useful one... the trouble is it implies that somebody, some other nation, or a large part of it were doing it... But I don't think this is true – it wasn't a Russian exercise, the attack on the Ukrainian people."

Michael Ellman 
Professor of economics Michael Ellman states that Stalin clearly committed crimes against humanity but whether he committed genocide depends on the definition of the term. In his 2007 article "Stalin and the Soviet Famine of 1932–33 Revisited", he wrote:

Team-Stalin's behaviour in 1930 – 34 clearly constitutes a crime against humanity (or a series of crimes against humanity) as that is defined in the 1998 Rome Statute of the International Criminal Court article 7, subsection 1 (d) and (h)[.]... Was Team-Stalin also guilty of genocide? That depends on how 'genocide' is defined.... The first physical element is the export of grain during a famine.... The second physical element was the ban on migration from Ukraine and the North Caucasus.... The third physical element is that 'Stalin made no effort to secure grain assistance from abroad[.]'... If the present author were a member of the jury trying this case he would support a verdict of not guilty (or possibly the Scottish verdict of not proven). The reasons for this are as follows. First, the three physical elements in the alleged crime can all be given non-genocidal interpretations. Secondly, the two mental elements are not unambiguous evidence of genocide. Suspicion of an ethnic group may lead to genocide, but by itself is not evidence of genocide. Hence it would seem that the necessary proof of specific intent is lacking.

Ellman states that in the end it all depends on the definition of genocide and that if Stalin was guilty of genocide in the Holodomor, then "[m]any other events of the 1917–53 era (e.g. the deportation of whole nationalities, and the 'national operations' of 1937–38) would also qualify as genocide, as would the acts of [many Western countries]", such as the Atlantic slave trade, the atomic bombings of Hiroshima and Nagasaki, and the sanctions against Iraq in the 1990s, among many others. Historian Hiroaki Kuromiya finds it persuasive.

Hiroaki Kuromiya 
Hiroaki Kuromiya states that although the famine was man-made and much of the deaths could have been avoided had it not been for Stalin's agricultural policies, he finds the evidence for the charge of genocide to be insufficient, and states that it is unlikely that Stalin intentionally caused the famine to kill millions, that he used famine as an alternative to the ethnic deportations that were commonly used as collective punishment under Stalin's rule, or that the famine was specifically engineered to target Ukrainians.

Noting that Stalin had few qualms with killing opponents of his rule and directly ordered several episodes of mass murder, Kuromiya finds the absence of an order to engineer a famine as punishment as unusual, in contrast to the Great Purge and the various deportations and 'national operations' which he personally ordered, and as pointing to the unlikelihood of Stalin deliberately orchestrating mass starvation. He also cites several measures taken by the Soviet government that, although ineffective, provide evidence against the intentionalist thesis, such as nine occasions of curtailing grain exports from different famine-stricken regions and clandestinely purchasing foreign aid to help alleviate the famine. He goes on to suggest that the prioritisation of military food stockpiles over the peasantry was likely motivated by Stalin's paranoia about what he believed to be an impending war with Japan and/or Poland rather than a desire to deliberately starve Ukrainians to death.

Ronald Grigor Suny 
Ronald Grigor Suny contrasts the intentions and motivation for the Holodomor and other Soviet mass killings with those of the Armenian genocide. He states that "although on moral grounds one form of mass killing is as reprehensible as another", for social scientists and historians "there is utility in restricting the term 'genocide' to what might more accurately be referred to as 'ethnocide,' that is, the deliberate attempt to eliminate a designated group." His definition of genocide, it "involves both the physical and the cultural extermination of a people."

Suny states that "Stalin's intentions and actions during the Ukrainian famine, no matter what sensationalist claims are made by nationalists and anti-Communists, were not the extermination of the Ukrainian people", and "a different set of explanations is required" for the Holodomor as well as for the Great Purges, the Gulag, and the Soviet ethnic cleansings of minority ethnic groups.

Stephen Kotkin 
According to Stephen Kotkin, while "there is no question of Stalin's responsibility for the famine" and many deaths could have been prevented if not for the "insufficient" and counterproductive Soviet measures, there is no evidence for Stalin's intention to kill the Ukrainians deliberately. According to Kotkin, the Holodomor "was a foreseeable byproduct of the collectivization campaign that Stalin forcibly imposed, but not an intentional murder. He needed the peasants to produce more grain, and to export the grain to buy the industrial machinery for the industrialization. Peasant output and peasant production was critical for Stalin's industrialization."

Viktor Kondrashin 
Historian Viktor Kondrashin asserts that Stalin's forced collectivisation programme drastically decreased peasants' quality of life and that it was the leading catalyst of the famine, and that although a notable drought did occur in 1931, it and other natural factors were not the primary causes of the famine. However, he rejects the claim that the famine was a targeted genocide of Ukrainians or any other ethnic group in the Soviet Union. According to Kondrashin, in some aspects, conditions for peasants were actually even worse and oppressive laws concerning agriculture even harsher in the Russian regions of the Kuban and Lower Volga, making the genocide thesis untenable in his view. While dismissing the notion that the famine was a genocide, Kondrashin does note, however, that Stalin took advantage of the famine crisis to neutralise the Ukrainian intelligentsia on the pretexts that they were a subversive force behind anti-Soviet uprisings by peasants. Kondrashin also assigns part of the blame for the famine to foreign governments that continued to trade with and buy food from the Soviet Union, in particular the United Kingdom, which imported approximately two million tonnes of Soviet grain during the famine years of 1932 and 1933.

Famine as a result of natural factors

Mark Tauger 
Mark Tauger, professor of history at West Virginia University, stated that the 1932 harvest was 30–40% smaller than official statistics and that the famine was "the result of a failure of economic policy, of the 'revolution from above'", not "a 'successful' nationality policy against Ukrainians or other ethnic groups." In his 1991 article "The 1932 Harvest and the Famine of 1933", Tauger wrote:

Western and even Soviet publications have described the 1933 famine in the Soviet Union as "man-made" or "artificial."... Proponents of this interpretation argue, using official Soviet statistics, that the 1932 grain harvest, especially in Ukraine, was not abnormally low and would have fed the population.... New Soviet archival data show that the 1932 harvest was much smaller than has been assumed and call for revision of the genocide interpretation. The low 1932 harvest worsened severe food shortages already widespread in the Soviet Union at least since 1931 and, despite sharply reduced grain exports, made famine likely if not inevitable in 1933.... Thus for Ukraine, the official sown area (18.1 million hectares) reduced by the share of sown area actually harvested (93.8 percent) to a harvested area of 17 million hectares and multiplied by the average yield (approximately 5 centners) gives a total harvest of 8.5 million tons, or a little less than 60 percent of the official 14.6 million tons.

Tauger stated that "the harsh 1932–1933 procurements only displaced the famine from urban areas" but the low harvest "made a famine inevitable." Tauger stated that it is difficult to accept the famine "as the result of the 1932 grain procurements and as a conscious act of genocide" but that "the regime was still responsible for the deprivation and suffering of the Soviet population in the early 1930s", and "if anything, these data show that the effects of [collectivization and forced industrialization] were worse than has been assumed."

Davies and Wheatcroft criticized Tauger's methodology in the 2004 edition of The Years of Hunger. Tauger criticized Davies and Wheatcroft's methodology in a 2006 article. In the 2009 edition of their book, Davies and Wheatcroft apologized for "an error in our calculations of the 1932 [grain] yield" and stated grain yield was "between 55 and 60 million tons, a low harvest, but substantially higher than Tauger's 50 million." While they disagree on the exact tonnage of the harvest, they reach a similar conclusion as Tauger in their book's most recent edition and state that "there were two bad harvests in 1931 and 1932, largely but not wholly a result of natural conditions", and "in our own work we, like V.P. Kozlov, have found no evidence that the Soviet authorities undertook a programme of genocide against Ukraine.... We do not think it appropriate to describe the unintended consequences of a policy as 'organised' by the policy-makers."

In a 2002 article for The Ukrainian Weekly, David R. Marples criticized Tauger's choice of rejecting state figures in favour of those from collective farms, where there was an incentive to underestimate yields, and he argued that Tauger's conclusion is incorrect because in his view "there is no such thing as a 'natural' famine, no matter the size of the harvest. A famine requires some form of state or human input." Marples criticized Tauger and other scholars for failing "to distinguish between shortages, droughts and outright famine", commenting that people died in the millions in Ukraine but not in Russia because "the 'massive program of rationing and relief' was selective."

Government recognition 

After campaigns from the Ukrainian Ministry of Foreign Affairs for the recognition of the Holodomor as a genocide, the governments of various countries have issued statements recognizing the Holodomor as genocide including Ukraine and 14 other countries, including Australia, Canada, Colombia, Georgia, Mexico, Peru and Poland. 

In November 2022, the Holodomor was recognized as a genocide by Germany, Ireland, Moldova, Romania, and the Belarusian opposition in exile. Pope Francis compared the Russian war in Ukraine with its targeted destruction of civilian infrastructure to the "terrible Holodomor Genocide", during an address at St. Peter's Square.

Countries recognising Holodomor as a genocide:

Other political bodies
  (European Parliament), 15 December 2022

See also 
 Assessment of the Kazakh famine of 1931–1933
 Droughts and famines in Russia and the Soviet Union
 Functionalism–intentionalism debate
 Law of Spikelets
 Mass killings under communist regimes
 Outline of Genocide studies

Notes

References

Bibliography

Further reading 
 Boriak, H. (2001). The Publication of Sources on the History of the 1932–1933 Famine-Genocide: History, Current State, and Prospects. Harvard Ukrainian Studies, 25(3/4), 167–186.
 Collins, Laura C. "Book Review: The Holodomor Reader: A Sourcebook on the Famine of 1932–1933 in Ukraine," Genocide Studies and Prevention (2015) 9#1: 114–115 online.
 Klid, Bohdan and Alexander J. Motyl, eds. The Holodomor Reader: A Sourcebook on the Famine of 1932–1933 in Ukraine (2012).
 Kulʹchytsʹkyi, Stanislav. "The Holodomor of 1932–33: How and Why?." East/West: Journal of Ukrainian Studies 2.1 (2015): 93–116. online
 Moore, Rebekah. "'A Crime Against Humanity Arguably Without Parallel in European History': Genocide and the 'Politics' of Victimhood in Western Narratives of the Ukrainian Holodomor." Australian Journal of Politics & History 58#3 (2012): 367–379.

Holodomor
20th-century famines
Famines in Russia
Famines in the Soviet Union
Genocide studies
Joseph Stalin